Greenbank is an unincorporated community on Whidbey Island in Island County, Washington, United States.

Greenbank, which was named by Calvin Philips after his homestead in Delaware,  has a population around 1626. It is the location of the Greenbank Farm, once the largest loganberry farm in the world, and the Greenbank Store, which was once owned and run by the Coupe family, descendants of Captain Thomas Coupe, founder of Coupeville and is now owned and run by new owners unrelated to the Coupe family. Opening in 1904, Greenbank Store features a deli, access to the post office, a small grocery store, as well as a full-service restaurant upstairs (opening again soon).

Greenbank Farm, once the largest loganberry farm in the country, now has fields of trails and an off leash dog area. The farm was saved from development when the Port of Coupeville agreed to purchase the 151 acre property and take on a 20 year bond payment in 1997. The purchase was completed in 2017 and continues to be operated by the Port of Coupeville.

Greenbank Farm with its large historic, “Whidbey 1904 Barn” is a much-sought venue for weddings, social gatherings and seasonal markets. The Shops at Greenbank Farm, independent tenants of the Port of Coupeville, feature Whidbey Pies Cafe, Greenbank Farm Wine Shop, Greenbank Cheese, Seaside & Sylvan Home, Artworks Gallery, and Raven Rocks Gallery & Gifts.  Whidbey Camano Land Trust has its headquarters upstairs in Barn C.

Behind the barns at the Greenbank Farm is a small marsh with a viewing platform recently built by the Whidbey Audubon Society. Many species of birds can be observed here including Red Wing Black-Birds and Warblers. Several solar projects have been implemented to reduce impact on the environment as well as offer free EV charging for all visitors.

Greenbank is served by State Route 525.

On highway 525, one mile south of the Greenbank farm, sits "Guest House Log Cottages", on twenty five forest acres with a wildlife viewing pond and six luxury log cottages. Nearby on Bakken road is the Greenbank Trading Post which specializes in antiques and used tools. Located on the corner of Bakken and Day roads is Greenbank Cellars, a winery with a small vineyard and tasting shop in an old fashioned barn. The winery is also the location of a 100-year-old nickelodeon which is in operating condition.

Points of interest 
 Meerkerk Rhododendron Gardens
 South Whidbey State Park

References

Unincorporated communities in Island County, Washington
Unincorporated communities in Washington (state)